Belda College is a co-educational college situated at Belda, Paschim Medinipur, West Bengal. The college was established in 1963 and offers undergraduate education. The college is affiliated to Vidyasagar University.

History 
The college was established on 16 August 1963. Belda Satyanarayana Mandir committee and Deuli Sudhir Primary School Committee donated the land and money.

Facilities and campus 
The college has its own hostels for boys and girls with a seating capacity of 80 and 30 respectively. The college have separate common rooms for boys and girls with facilities for indoor games like carrom and chess. Further there is provision for playing outdoor games. There is a in campus canteen offering snacks and beverages. The college also have a Netaji Subhas Open University and an IGNOU study center to facilitate distance education.

The college has a well-developed library with about 15,128  books, journals and periodicals along with internet and computer and photocopying facilities. There is a reading room with a seating capacity of 80 students. There are eleven laboratories with minimum adequate facilities for the laboratory based subjects.

Accreditation
The college is recognized by the University Grants Commission (UGC) and accredited as a B grade college by the National Assessment and Accreditation Council (NAAC).

See also

References

External links
 
Vidyasagar University
University Grants Commission
National Assessment and Accreditation Council

Educational institutions established in 1963
Colleges affiliated to Vidyasagar University
Universities and colleges affiliated with the Bharat Sevashram Sangha
Universities and colleges in Paschim Medinipur district
1963 establishments in West Bengal